The 1987–88 Winnipeg Jets season was the 16th season of the Winnipeg Jets, their ninth season in the National Hockey League. The Jets placed third in the Smythe to qualify for the playoffs. The Jets lost to the Edmonton Oilers in the first round.

Offseason
On June 5, 1987, the Jets traded away Perry Turnbull to the St. Louis Blues in exchange for a fifth round draft pick in the 1987 NHL Entry Draft.  Turnbull had an injury plagued 1986-87 season, scoring a goal and six points in 26 games.  From 1984 to 1986, he had back-to-back 20+ goal seasons in his first two years with Winnipeg.

Three days later, on June 8, 1987, the Jets traded away Brian Mullen and a tenth round draft pick in the 1987 NHL Entry Draft to the New York Rangers for the Rangers fifth round pick in the 1988 NHL Entry Draft and their third round pick in the 1989 NHL Entry Draft.  Mullen had been with Winnipeg since the 1982-83 season, and was coming off a 19 goal and 51 point season in 1986-87.

On June 13, 1987, the Jets participated in the 1987 NHL Entry Draft, and with their first round selection, 16th overall, Winnipeg selected defenseman Bryan Marchment from the Belleville Bulls of the OHL.  Marchment had six goals and 44 points in 52 games with the Bulls in 1986-87.

During training camp, on September 30, 1987, the Jets made another trade with the New York Rangers, acquiring George McPhee from the Rangers for the Jets fourth round draft pick in the 1989 NHL Entry Draft.  One week later, the Jets sent McPhee to the New Jersey Devils for the Devils seventh round draft pick in the 1989 NHL Entry Draft.

Regular season

Final standings

Schedule and results

Playoffs
The Jets lost the Division Semi-Finals (4-1) to the Edmonton Oilers.

Player statistics

Regular season
Scoring

Goaltending

Playoffs
Scoring

Goaltending

Awards and records

Transactions

Trades

Free agents

Draft picks
The Jets selected the following players at the 1987 NHL Entry Draft, which was held at Joe Louis Arena in Detroit, Michigan, on June 13, 1987.

NHL Entry Draft

Farm teams

See also
 1987–88 NHL season

References

External links

Winnipeg Jets season, 1987-88
Winnipeg Jets (1972–1996) seasons
Winn